This is a list of mayors of Bonn. The list includes the mayors (Oberbürgermeister) since 1800, as well as the city managers (Oberstadtdirektoren) from 1947 until 1996 when the office was terminated.


Mayors (Oberbürgermeister)
1800–1802: Johann Joseph Eichhoff
1802–1804: Nicolas Joseph Lejeune (kommissarisch)
1804–1816: Anton Maria Karl Graf von Belderbusch
1816–1816: Peter Joseph Eilender (kommissarisch)
1817–1839: Johann Martin Joseph Windeck
1840–1850: Karl Edmund Joseph Oppenhoff
1851–1875: Leopold Kaufmann
1875–1891: Hermann Jakob Doetsch
1891–1919: Wilhelm Spiritus
1920–1922: Fritz Bottler
1923–1931: Dr. Johannes Nepomuk Maria Falk
1932–1933: Dr. Franz Wilhelm Lürken
1933–1945: Ludwig Rickert
1945–1948: Eduard Spoelgen
1948–1951: Dr. Peter Stockhausen, CDU
1951–1956: Peter Maria Busen, CDU
1956–1969: Dr. Wilhelm Daniels, CDU
1969–1975: Peter Kraemer, CDU
1975–1994: Dr. Hans Daniels, CDU
1994–2009: Bärbel Dieckmann, SPD
2009-2015: Jürgen Nimptsch, SPD
2015-2020: Ashok-Alexander Sridharan, CDU
2020-    : Katja Dörner, Alliance 90/The Greens

City managers (Oberstadtdirektoren)
1947–1956: Dr. Johannes Langendörfer
1956–1964: Dr. Franz Schmidt CDU
1964–1975: Dr. Wolfgang Hesse CDU
1976–1987: Dr. Karl-Heinz van Kaldenkerken CDU
1987–1996: Dieter Diekmann CDU

See also
 Timeline of Bonn

Bonn
Bonn
North Rhine-Westphalia-related lists